Vacerrena nana is a species of sea snail, a marine gastropod mollusk in the family Fissurellidae, the keyhole limpets and slit limpets.

Description
The length of the shell attains 2 mm, the width 1¼ mm, the height 2 mm.

The rather solid shel is elevated-conic. It is sculptured with 15 radiating ribs, the front ones wider apart. The apex is acute and strongly recurved. The aperture is oval.

Distribution
This marine species occurs in the Red Sea.

References

 Kilburn, R. N. (1978). The Emarginulinae (Mollusca: Gastropoda: Fissurellidae) of southern Africa and Mozambique. Annals of the Natal Museum. 23(2): 431-454. 
 Drivas, J. & Jay, M. (1985). Shells of Réunion. 3. Family Fissurellidae. Subfamily Emarginulinae. La Conchiglia. 17(194–195): 3–6.
 Dekker, H. & Orlin, Z. (2000) Check-list of Red Sea mollusca. Spirula, 47(supplement), 1-46.

External links
 Adams H. (1872). Further descriptions of new species of shells collected by Robert M'Andrew, Esq., in the Red Sea. Proceedings of the Zoological Society of London. (1872): 9-15, pl. 3
 Herbert D.G. (2015). An annotated catalogue and bibliography of the taxonomy, synonymy and distribution of the Recent Vetigastropoda of South Africa (Mollusca). Zootaxa. 4049(1): 1-98
 To World Register of Marine Species

Fissurellidae
Gastropods described in 1978